Abdul-Jabar Hashim Hanoon (born 1 January 1970) is an Iraqi football defender who played for the Iraq national football team in the 2000 Asian Cup. He also played for Al-Quwa Al-Jawiya.

Jabar Hashim was one of the great stalwarts of Iraqi football and the national team during the 1990s. He was regular in the national team during Iraq’s 1994 World Cup qualifying campaign.

Jabar played at the 2000 Asian Cup in Lebanon, where he was heavily criticised for his performances, which later resulted in being dropped for the World Cup qualifiers by Milan Zivadinovic.

References

External links
 

Iraqi footballers
Iraq international footballers
1996 AFC Asian Cup players
2000 AFC Asian Cup players
Living people
1970 births
Association football defenders
Al-Talaba SC players
Al-Quwa Al-Jawiya players
Al-Gharafa SC players
Dibba Al-Hisn Sports Club players